This is the list of football clubs (teams) in Kazakhstan.

Kazakhstan Premier League
FC Aktobe, Aktobe
FC Atyrau, Atyrau
FC Irtysh, Pavlodar
FC Kaisar, Kyzylorda
FC Kairat, Almaty
FC Kazakhmys, Satpaev
FC Kyzylzhar, Petropavl
FC Astana, Nur-Sultan
FC Okzhetpes, Kokshetau
FC Ordabasy, Shymkent
FC Shakhter, Karaganda
FC Taraz, Taraz
FC Tobol, Kostanay
FC Vostok, Oskemen
FC Zhetysu, Taldykorgan

Kazakhstan First Division
FC Akzhayik, Oral
FC Avangard, Petropavl
FC Bolat, Temirtau
FC Caspiy, Aktau
FC Ekibastuz, Ekibastuz
FC Gornyak, Khromtau
FC Spartak, Semey

Lower leagues
FC Ekibastuzets, Ekibastuz
FC Yassi, Turkestan
FC Astana, Nur-Sultan

Children's football club
Arlandar FC, Nur-Sultan

Defunct
FC Almaty, Almaty 2000–2008
FC Arman, Kentau 1992
FC Azhar, Kokshetau 1992–93
FC Dostyk, Almaty 1993
FC Megasport, Almaty 2005–2008
FC SKIF Ordabasy, Shymkent 1992–96
FC Ulytau, Zhezkazgan 1967–97

  
Kazakhstan
clubs
Football clubs